Masilamaninathar temple, Tharangambadi, also known as Alappur  is a Siva temple in Tharangambadi in Mayiladuthurai district in Tamil Nadu (India). It is situated at a distance of 8 km from Tirukkadayur.

The temple is situated 300m north to the famous Danish fort Dansborg. This is one of the few shore temples in India.

Vaippu Sthalam
It is one of the shrines of the Vaippu Sthalams sung by Tamil Saivite Nayanars Appar and Sundarar.

Presiding deity
The presiding deity is known as Masilamaninathar, Masilamanisvarar and Masilanathar. His consort is known as Akilandesvari.

The earlier temple
The earlier temple was very near to the sea. The waves of the sea touch the temple. In the kosta of the old temples Dakshinamurthi and Lingotpavar are found. There is also a shrine for Vinayaka. In front of the sanctum sanctorum, which is closed, nandhi and bali peeta are found.

The present temple
Just in front of the old temple, the present temple,  is found now. The Kumbhabhishekham  of this temple was held on 1 September 2013. In the sanctum sanctorum the presiding deity is found. In front of the presiding deity Nandhi and balipeeta are found. At the left side of the shrine, the shrine of the goddess is found. In the kosta Dakshinamurthy, Lingotpava and Brahma are found. In the prakara shrines of Vinayaka, Subramania with his consorts Valli and Deivanai, Balamuruga, Akilandesvari and Gajalakshmi are found, followed by Chandikeswara and Navagraha shrine. Next to them Chandra, Surya and Bairava are found.

Inscriptions
In inscriptions the names of Kulasekarapatnam and Sadakanbadi are found.

History 
Masilamani Nathar Temple is more than 700 year old monument. This temple was built by the Pandiya King Maravarman Kulasekara Pandiyan I in the year 1306. The temple's architecture is a conglomeration of Tamil and Chinese Architecture, in an attempt to attract Chinese merchants and visitors who were visiting India in those days.

References

External links
 மூவர் தேவார வைப்புத்தலங்கள், aLappUr, Sl.No.14 of 139 temples
 Shiva Temples, தேவார வைப்புத்தலங்கள், அளப்பூர், Sl.No.10 of 133 temples, page1

Old Temple

New Temple

Hindu temples in Mayiladuthurai district